Les Bonbons is a compilation album by Jacques Brel. Also known as Les Vieux, Jacques Brel Accompagné par François Rauber et Son Orchestre, and Encore, the album was released in 1966 by Barclay. The original 1966 album was itself a composite of two earlier 10" releases, one from 1963 and one from 1964. The album was reissued on 23 September 2003 under the title Les Bonbons as part of the 16-CD box set Boîte à Bonbons by Barclay (980 817-0).

Track listing 

 Tracks 1–12 constituted the original 1966 album.
 Tracks 13–14 were added to the album when it was reissued as part of the 16-CD box set Boîte à Bonbons.

Personnel 

 Jacques Brel – composer, vocals
 François Rauber – orchestra conductor
 Gerhardt Lehner – recording engineer & audio mixing (uncredited)
 Jean-Marie Guérin – mastering
 Gérard Jouannest – composer 
 Hubert Grooteclaes – photography
 Pierre Fournier – photography

Certifications and sales

References 

Jacques Brel albums
1966 albums
French-language albums
Barclay (record label) albums
Universal Records albums
Albums conducted by François Rauber